Basic Element is a Swedish Eurodance hip-hop group formed in 1992. The group returned in 2005 and is still releasing new material.

From Malmö in Sweden, the group originally consisted of rapper/singer Peter Thelenius (Petrus), and keyboardist Cesar Zamini, accordion and vocalist Zetma Prenbo.
Later vocalists were Saunet Sparell, Marie Fredriksson (not to be confused with the Roxette singer Marie Fredriksson).
Currently, the band is the original member and founder Peter Thelenius, along with his wife Linda Thelenius and Jonas Wesslander.

History
Peter Thelenius and Cesar Zamini began the group in 1992, searched for a singer through the employment office and found Zetma. In 1993, they made a record deal with EMI Records, thus releasing their first single "Move Me". In 1994, "Move Me" was followed up by hits like "The Promise Man", reaching number 1 in the Swedish charts.

In 1995, Zetma left the band (because of her pregnancy) and Saunet Sparell replaced her. The new album "The Ultimate Ride" (including the singles "The Ride" and "The Fiddle") was released. Also, Peter and Caesar started to have disagreements about the band's future, this causing Cesar to leaving the band. Peter has since then continued with the band itself. The group's third album ("Star Tracks") sounded more like 1970s disco. Then Sparell left because she thought that Thelenius only cared about being famous, and so the project was put on ice. In 1997, Peter released a solo album ("Trust Then Pain") under the name "Petrus". In 1998, Basic Element returned with a new album (which included the original Eurodance sound) with Marie Fredriksson (not to be confused with the singer of Roxette) as the new singer.

From 1999, the two members went on a hiatus, but in 2005, the group returned with a remake of their 1995 hit "This Must Be a Dream" and with Mathias Olofson as a new member of the band. In February 2006, they released a new single called "Raise the Gain" with a slightly different sound. On 7 February 2007, the group released its comeback album "The Empire Strikes Back". Later in 2007, Marie Fredriksson left the group and was replaced by Andrea Myrander as the singer and Jonas Wesslander as the rapper. In 2008, the album "The Truth" was released. The band also released a new song called "Got U Screaming" (2010). In January 2011, it was announced on the group's home page that Andrea Myrander had officially left. A few months later, in May 2011, a new single called "Turn Me On" was announced during a concert. It was posted on YouTube on 27 May.

In April 2012 Basic Element signed a deal with the Swedish record label Family Tree and on 24 April, a song called "Shades" (featuring Max C and Taz) was posted on YouTube. It was announced that it will be released as a single in June. The group is still lacking a female singer and the songs thus only features male vocals. The single also marks a change of style as it differs significantly from the other material released after their 2005 comeback. A YouTube commenter described it as a mixture of Avicii, Swedish House Mafia and "We Found Love" by Rihanna and Calvin Harris. Vocalist Max C was featured on Swedish House Mafia member Axwell’s single "I Found You". Basic Element will also be the opening act for Avicii on the yearly "Russens dag" event at Tusenfryd, Norway.

Discography

Albums
Basic Injection (1994)
The Ultimate Ride (1995)
Star Tracks (1996)
The Earthquake (1998)
The Empire Strikes Back (2007)
The Truth (2008)

Singles

References

Swedish electronic music groups
English-language singers from Sweden
Swedish house music groups
Swedish Eurodance groups
Swedish hip hop groups